Chang Sisi (born May 6, 1987 in Jinan, Shandong) is a Chinese singer.

She was accepted into the China Conservatory of Music in 2005. She studied music under Jin Tielin and Liu Chang. In March 2008, she joined the Chinese People's Liberation Army Naval Song and Dance Troupe. In 2016, she performed in I Am A Singer 4.

References

1987 births
Living people
Musicians from Jinan
China Conservatory of Music alumni
21st-century Chinese women singers
Singers from Shandong